Surendranath is a common Indian male name. It may refer to:

 Surendra Nath Kohli (1916–1997), Indian admiral
 Surendra Nath (1926–1994), Punjab governor 
 Surendranath Banerjee (1848–1925), Indian National Congress president
 Surendranath (cricketer) (1937–2012), Indian cricketer
 Surendranath Dasgupta (1887–1962), Sanskrit scholar
 Surendranath Medhi (1930–2011), real name of writer Saurabh Kumar Chaliha 
 Surendranath Mitra (circa 1850 – 1890), devotee of Sri Ramakrishna Paramahamsa

Indian masculine given names